Vladimir Belonogov (born 6 July 1977) is a Kazakhstani rower. He competed in the men's single sculls event at the 2000 Summer Olympics.

References

1977 births
Living people
Kazakhstani male rowers
Olympic rowers of Kazakhstan
Rowers at the 2000 Summer Olympics
People from Temirtau